Edward Alexander Bott (April 11, 1887 - 1974) was a Canadian psychologist.

Career
Bott was born near Ingersoll, Ontario, in 1887.

In 1912, he joined the Faculty at the University of Toronto and took over the psychological laboratory which had been established by James Mark Baldwin in 1891.  In 1925, he established the St. George’s School for Child Study at the university which became the Institute of Child Study.. In 1926, he established an independent Department of Psychology and remained its Head until he retired in 1960.

He was one of the founders of organized psychology within Canada. In 1938, prior to the onset of the Second World War a group of psychologists came together to agree how they could assist in the process of personnel selection for the military. This group included Roy B. Liddy, Ned Bott, John MacEachran, George Humphrey, and George Ferguson. From this group was established the Canadian Psychological Association in 1939. In 1940, Liddy became its inaugural President and in the following year, Bott became president.

Personal life
He was married to Helen McMurchie Bott who worked with him at the Institute of Child Study and was the father of noted network analyst and psychoanalyst Elizabeth Spillius.

Research
He conducted research into the application of psychology to social issues.

Awards
 1947 - Order of the British Empire for development of training procedures for Royal Air Force
 Fellow, Canadian Psychological Association
 1969 - Centennial Medal, Canadian Psychological Association

References

1887 births
1974 deaths
20th-century Canadian psychologists
Canadian psychologists
People from Ingersoll, Ontario
University of Toronto alumni
Presidents of the Canadian Psychological Association